Nikolai Viktorovich Tyunin (born 6 January 1987) is a Russian professional football coach and a former player. He works as an analyst coach with FC Khimki.

Club career
He made his professional debut in the Russian Second Division in 2006 for FC Presnya Moscow.

He played 7 seasons in the Russian Football National League for 4 different teams.

Honours
 Russian Cup winner: 2006 (played in the early stages of the 2005–06 tournament for the main squad of FC Spartak Moscow).

References

1987 births
People from Kamchatka Krai
Living people
Russian footballers
Association football midfielders
FC Spartak Moscow players
FC Asmaral Moscow players
FC Rotor Volgograd players
FC Ural Yekaterinburg players
FC Khimki players
FC Tyumen players
FC Gornyak Uchaly players
FC Zenit-Izhevsk players
FC Spartak-2 Moscow players
FC Spartak-MZhK Ryazan players